Dursun Bozkurt (12 February 1925 – 24 December 1992) was a Turkish alpine skier. He competed in three events at the 1948 Winter Olympics.

References

1925 births
1992 deaths
Turkish male alpine skiers
Olympic alpine skiers of Turkey
Alpine skiers at the 1948 Winter Olympics
Sportspeople from Gümüşhane
20th-century Turkish people